The John Edmunds Apartment House (also known as Mirador) is a historic apartment house in Pensacola, Florida, United States. It is located at 2007 East Gadsden Street. On September 29, 1983, it was added to the U.S. National Register of Historic Places.

References

 Escambia County listings at National Register of Historic Places
 Escambia County listings at Florida's Office of Cultural and Historical Programs

Buildings and structures in Pensacola, Florida
National Register of Historic Places in Escambia County, Florida
Apartment buildings in Florida
Residential buildings on the National Register of Historic Places in Florida